The Orphan Killer is a 2011 independent horror film written and directed by Matt Farnsworth. It was produced by Farnsworth and Full Fathom 5. Farnsworth has stated that he has plans for sequels and a web series.

Plot
The film follows the life of two children who become wards of the state in New Jersey after a home invasion results in the murder of their parents. Having witnessed the murder, Marcus is forever changed. The siblings are sent to a Catholic orphanage where Audrey is subsequently adopted and Marcus is left behind. He suffers abuse at the hands of the caretakers and as a punishment is masked and exiled. Never forgiving his sister for abandoning him, Marcus returns to his sister's life many years later in adulthood, still masked, wanting to teach her a lesson.

Cast
 Diane Foster as Audrey
Dana DeVestern as Young Audrey
 David Backhaus as Marcus Miller
Spencer List as Young Marcus
 Matt Farnsworth as Mike
 James McCaffrey as Detective Jones
 John Savage as Detective Walker
 Karen Young as Sister Mary
 Charlotte Maier as Sister Constance
 Margot White as Jenny Miller
 Mike Doyle as Marcus Miller Sr.
 Ivan Martin as Jim
 Karen Olivo as Angie
 Matthew Arkin as Bob
 Ezra Knight as Simon
 Allison Salvetti as Ghost Orphan
 Jon David Casey as Jerry

Release
A limited test release of The Orphan Killer was distributed through Facebook. The film also premiered at the Sitges Film Festival, where it was shown in the Brigadoon section of the festival. The film was also shown at the 30th Festival de Cine de Terror de Molins de Rei. In Mexico, the film premiered in three different locations across the country at the Morbido Film Festival.

Awards
The film received an award at the Festival de Cine de Terror de Molins de Rei for "Best Picture". In Italy, director Farnsworth was honored with an Antonio Margheriti award at the Tohorror film festival for his work on the film. The award "symbolizes the birth of a new master creator in the genre and his monster".

Reception

Reception for the film has been mixed with Germany banning the film. HorrorNews.net said that the movie is "a return to classic horror with a lethal bang". Dread Central also reviewed the film, stating "It is a low-budget offering and often looks like it" but that "You're getting a new slasher, one with a lot of similarities to some of our favorite characters of the past, but with its own unique spin". Fangoria panned the film, writing that "these filmmakers had everything they needed to create something special, and simply chose to go the least interesting route".

Soundtrack
The soundtrack for The Orphan Killer was released in February 2011 on the movie's Facebook page.

Track list 
 First Blood - First Blood
 Affiance - Nostra Culpa
 Asking Alexandria - Someone, Somewhere
 Deception of a Ghost - These Voices
 Anew Revolution - Head Against the Wall
 This or the Apocalypse - Charmer
 Most Precious Blood - A Danger to Myself and Others
 A Bullet for a Pretty Boy - The Deceiver
 Dawn of Ashes - Seething the Flesh in the River of Phlegethon
 First Blood - Conflict
 Born of Osiris - Follow the Signs
 No Bragging Rights - Death of an Era
 First Blood - Execution
 Ventana - Cry Little Sister

Sequels
Farnsworth announced plans for a sequel to The Orphan Killer shortly after the film's premiere in 2011. In an interview with Starburst magazine he stated that he had completed the scripts for a second and third films and that he planned to release a web series based upon the first film in 2013.

References

External links
 
 

American slasher films
American serial killer films
2011 horror films
2011 films
American independent films
2010s English-language films
2010s American films